Kil is a locality and the seat of Kil Municipality in Värmland County, Sweden with 7,842 inhabitants in 2010.

It is a railway junction which unites railways from five directions, all but one having passenger services. Swedish world elite high jumper Stefan Holm competes for the Kil AIK athletics club. Per Åslund who plays for the Färjestad BK is from Kil.

References 

Municipal seats of Värmland County
Swedish municipal seats
Populated places in Värmland County
Populated places in Kil Municipality